Zeina (born Wessam Reda Ismail Morsi, 4 February 1977) is an Egyptian actress and model.  She began acting in 1995 and has since performed in many movies and television series, including Afaryt el-Sayala (Ghosts of Sayala) (2004) and El Haya fe Montaha el Laza (Joys of Life) (2005).

Career
Zeina started her career as a model in video clips, using her real name Wesam. She was chosen by director Daoud Abdel Sayed to play the role of Hanna in Ard El Kof (Land of Fear), her acting debut. She also worked as a broadcaster in one of the channels of Arab Radio and Television where she presented technical programmes.

With the entry into the acting world, she chose to name herself "Zeina". She was called "Sophia Loren of Arabs" by director Youssef Chahine after he saw her in the movie Montaha El Laza (Joys). She won the title of best actress in 2005 and 2006 in the public polls and she also won the award for outstanding performance for her role in the series Hdrat El Motaham Aby (My Father the accused).

Artist Ahmed Zaki called her "Penélope Cruz" for the similarities between herself and the Spanish actress. Zeina participated in a number of cinematographic works, such as El Haya fe Montaha el Laza (Joys of Life), Sayed El Atefy (Lord of the Emotional), El Sahabh (Ghost), El Gezyra (island), 90 Minutes, Puskas, Trapezoid, Captain Hima, One - Zero, Two Girls from Egypt, Adult and Seven Albermbp.

Zeina also starred in TV series beginning with Shaba ra2 gedan and Wael Nour in 1995. She also appeared in Afaryt el-Sayala (English title Ghosts of Sayala), Lel Sarwa Hesabat o5ra (Wealth Other Accounts), Ali Wika, Hadret el Motaham Aby (My Father The Accused), and Layaly. She was one of the main Characters in the Ramadan 2017 series, Le a3la se3r (For the highest prices) starring as Laila.

She has also appeared in some radio soaps such as Sinbad Emad, and Runaway to Travel.

Personal life

Legal case
In January 2008 a court ruling sentenced Zeina to two months imprisonment and a fine of  because a traffic officer and soldier claimed that Zeina had verbally assaulted them while they were issuing a traffic violation. She obtained an acquittal from the Court of Appeals in April 2008 claiming the government needed to prove its case against fraud and falsification of records by the officers concerned.

Marriage
Zeina had twin sons in October 2013. She claimed that their father is the actor Ahmed Ezz after a customary marriage. Ezz denied such allegations and asked for a DNA test to verify her claims. In 2015, Cairo family court ruled in favour of Zeina to register the boys with Ezz being the biological father after he refused to do the test.

Filmography

Cinema

Television
Le a3la se3r (For the highest Price) 2017
Afaryt el-Sayala (Ghosts of Sayala)
Hadret El Mottaham Abi
Ali Ya Wika
Layali

References

External links

Egyptian film actresses
Egyptian female models
1977 births
Living people
Egyptian television actresses
Actresses from Cairo